The following is a list of terrestrial ecoregions of the People's Republic of China and the Republic of China, according to the World Wide Fund for Nature.

The transition between two of the planet's eight terrestrial biogeographic realms – the Palearctic, which includes temperate and boreal Eurasia, and Indomalaya, which includes tropical South and Southeast Asia – extends through southern China.

Tropical and subtropical moist broadleaf forests
 Guizhou Plateau broadleaf and mixed forests
 Hainan Island monsoon rain forests
 Jiang Nan subtropical evergreen forests
 Northern Indochina subtropical moist forests
 South China Sea Islands
 South China-Vietnam subtropical evergreen forests
 South Taiwan monsoon rain forests (Taiwan)
 Taiwan subtropical evergreen forests (Taiwan)
 Yunnan Plateau subtropical evergreen forests

Temperate broadleaf and mixed forests
 Central China loess plateau mixed forests
 Changbai Mountains mixed forests
 Changjiang Plain evergreen forests
 Daba Mountains evergreen forests
 Huang He Plain mixed forests
 Manchurian mixed forests
 Northeast China Plain deciduous forests
 Qin Ling Mountains deciduous forests
 Sichuan Basin evergreen broadleaf forests
 Tarim Basin deciduous forests and steppe

Temperate coniferous forests
 Altai montane forest and forest steppe
 Da Hinggan–Dzhagdy Mountains conifer forests
 Helanshan montane conifer forests
 Hengduan Mountains subalpine conifer forests
 Northeastern Himalayan subalpine conifer forests
 Nujiang Lancang Gorge alpine conifer and mixed forests
 Qilian Mountains conifer forests
 Qionglai–Minshan conifer forests
 Tian Shan montane conifer forests

Temperate grasslands, savannas, and shrublands
 Altai steppe and semi-desert
 Daurian forest steppe
 Emin Valley steppe
 Mongolian–Manchurian grassland
 Tian Shan foothill arid steppe

Flooded grasslands and savannas
 Amur meadow steppe
 Bohai Sea saline meadow
 Nenjiang River grassland
 Suiphun–Khanka meadows and forest meadows
 Yellow Sea saline meadow

Montane grasslands and shrublands
 Altai alpine meadow and tundra
 Central Tibetan Plateau alpine steppe
 Eastern Himalayan alpine shrub and meadows
 Karakoram–West Tibetan Plateau alpine steppe
 North Tibetan Plateau–Kunlun Mountains alpine desert
 Northwestern Himalayan alpine shrub and meadows
 Ordos Plateau steppe
 Pamir alpine desert and tundra
 Qilian Mountains subalpine meadows
 Southeast Tibet shrub and meadows
 Tian Shan montane steppe and meadows
 Tibetan Plateau alpine shrublands and meadows
 Yarlung Tsangpo arid steppe

Deserts and xeric shrublands
 Alashan Plateau semi-desert
 Eastern Gobi desert steppe
 Junggar Basin semi-desert
 Qaidam Basin semi-desert
 Taklimakan desert

 
Ecoregions

China